The Sicilian Ethnographic Museum Giuseppe Pitrè (Italian: Museo Etnografico Siciliano Giuseppe Pitrè) is a museum in Palermo, Italy.

The museum has two locations: the main part is located in one of the Palazzina Cinese's guesthouse, inside La Favorita Park, and another is in the Albergaria quarter, within the historic centre of Palermo.

The museum was founded by the scholar Giuseppe Pitrè in 1909 and is named after him. It houses a rich library containing more than 30,000 volumes and provides many types of documentation about Sicilian culture, traditions and folklore.

Costumes 
The costume section opens with men's clothes. The most primitive is that of shepherds consisting of a jacket and breeches formed with goat skins. Various models of festive costume, of which the breeches (càusi), the waistcoat ('u cileccu), the jacket, the cap or a turban are some of the typical elements. Shirts and underpants are part of a newer kit. With fine linen, the shirt is wide and wide, while the underpants are always long and white. Of orbace for example is the typical costume of the peasants of Modica.

On display in the museum are disparate simple women's costumes for fabrics and cutting, sumptuous for brocades and sewers. Those of the peasants were usually composed of a cotton bust (dispersals), ''the petti coat and an apron.

References

External links

 Official website
 Museo etnografico siciliano Giuseppe Pitrè - balarm.it

1909 establishments in Italy
Museums established in 1909
Museums in Palermo
Libraries in Palermo
Ethnographic museums in Italy
Biographical museums in Italy